Dermott School District  is a school district headquartered in Dermott, Arkansas. In Chicot County, it serves Dermott. A portion of the district extends into Desha County, where it serves Halley. Another portion extends into Drew County, where it includes Collins.

In 1979 the Collins and Selma school districts dissolved, with portions of the students going to the Dermott school district.

Schools
 Dermott High School
 Dermott Elementary School

References

Further reading
These include maps of predecessor districts:
 (Download)

External links
 

School districts in Arkansas
Education in Chicot County, Arkansas
Education in Desha County, Arkansas
Education in Drew County, Arkansas